Justin McGrath (born 5 December 1970) is a former Australian rules footballer who played for Fitzroy in the Australian Football League (AFL) in 1991.

He was recruited to Hawthorn from Ballarat YCW in the Ballarat Football League (BFL) with the 56th selection in the 1988 VFL Draft, but did not play a senior game for them. Fitzroy then selected him with the 9th selection in the 1991 Pre-season Draft, and he played eight games for the Lions in 1991.

References

External links

Living people
1970 births
Fitzroy Football Club players
Australian rules footballers from Ballarat